Iolaus tajoraca is a butterfly in the family Lycaenidae. It is found in Djibouti, Ethiopia, Somalia, Kenya, Uganda and Tanzania. The habitat consists of arid savanna.

The larvae feed on Oncocalyx fischeri, Plicosepalus curviflorus, Plicosepalus kalachariensis, Plicosepalus meridianus and Englerina kagehensis.

Subspecies
Iolaus tajoraca tajoraca (Djibouti, Ethiopia, Somalia, northern Kenya, northern Uganda)
Iolaus tajoraca ertli Aurivillius, 1916 (Tanzania, eastern Kenya)

References

Butterflies described in 1870
Iolaus (butterfly)
Butterflies of Africa
Taxa named by Francis Walker (entomologist)